Eleocharis montevidensis is a species of spikesedge known by the common name sand spikerush. It is a widespread coastal plant native to the Americas. It grows in moist, sandy spots in many habitat types, including lakes, riverbanks, wet meadows, and springs. It has a disjunct distribution, in North America (southern United States from California to the Carolinas, Mexico, Guatemala, Honduras) and South America (Brazil, Peru, Argentina, Uruguay).

Description
Eleocharis montevidensis is a rhizomatous perennial herb forming tufts or mats of erect, firm stems up to half a meter tall. The narrow grasslike leaves are dark purplish or reddish brown at the bases, becoming lighter in color toward the tips, and drying to a thin, papery texture. The inflorescence is an oval-shaped spikelet appearing at the tip of the stem. It is under a centimeter long and made up of several flowers covered in brownish bracts.

Eleocharis montevidensis have often been called either E. montana or E. palmeri in some North American publications.

Cultivation
It is sometimes cultivated as an aquatic plant for water gardens.

References

External links
Jepson Manual Treatment
USDA Plants Profile
Photo gallery

montevidensis
Freshwater plants
Flora of North America
Flora of Central America
Flora of South America
Flora of the United States
Plants described in 1837
Garden plants of North America
Garden plants of South America